The first season of the American supernatural drama television series Buffy the Vampire Slayer originally aired between March 10 and June 2, 1997 on The WB. Conceived as a mid-season replacement, the season consists of twelve episodes, each running approximately 45 minutes in length, and originally aired on Mondays at 9:00 pm ET.

Plot 
Teenager Buffy Summers is the Slayer, a lone young woman chosen in each generation to be bestowed with mystical powers to fight demons, beings descended from the "Old Ones", the evil inhabitants of Earth before humans, who hope to rule Earth once more. Prior to the events of the season, Buffy’s Slayer responsibilities caused her to lose her friends and be kicked out of her old school for having burned down the gym, leading her and her mother Joyce to move to Sunnydale, where Buffy hopes to have a fresh start free of the Slayer role. 

Her plans are complicated by Rupert Giles, Sunnydale High's librarian and her new Watcher, the Slayer's guardian and mentor, who reminds her of the inescapable presence of evil in the world that only she has the ability to fight. Unbeknownst to Buffy, Sunnydale is built atop a Hellmouth, a portal to demon dimensions that attracts supernatural phenomena to the area. Buffy meets two schoolmates, Xander Harris and Willow Rosenberg, who resolve to help her in her Slayer responsibilities. Together with Giles, they form the "Scooby Gang", and decide to take a combined approach to fighting demons, rather than the Slayer acting alone as is traditional. 

The Scoobies also receive help from Angel, a vampire cursed with a soul, whose motives are not entirely clear at first. There is romantic tension between the group due to Buffy's burgeoning attraction to Angel, Xander's unrequited crush on Buffy, and Xander's own obliviousness of Willow's affection for him. The Scoobies distrust Angel at first but warm to him as the season progresses, while Giles comes to genuinely care for the other Scoobies and realizes that he must take an active presence in fighting demons and cannot simply rely on books and theoretical knowledge. The Scoobies often clash with popular student Cordelia Chase, who attempted to befriend Buffy on her first day, but Buffy objected to her treatment of the other Scoobies. Over the season, Cordelia becomes aware of the supernatural world around her and becomes a reluctant ally to the Scoobies, revealing a more intelligent side to her seemingly vapid personality. 

Although the season contains several standalone episodes, there is season-long story arc which focuses on The Master, an ancient vampire who recognizes Angel as having been a great evil prior to being cursed with a soul. The Master commands a cult of vampires known as the Order of Aurelius and is trapped in another dimension by mystical forces. 

The Master plans to kill the Slayer to regain his former power and open the Hellmouth. Buffy learns of a prophecy involving her death at the hands of The Master. Just as The Master begins his plot, Buffy finally confronts him. The Master bites Buffy and leaves her to drown. Buffy recovers and confronts The Master again. After a final standoff, The Master is impaled and killed on a piece of wood after falling through a skylight, leading Buffy to accept her responsibilities as the Slayer with help from her friends.

Cast and characters

Main cast 
 Sarah Michelle Gellar as Buffy Summers
 Nicholas Brendon as Xander Harris
 Alyson Hannigan as Willow Rosenberg
 Charisma Carpenter as Cordelia Chase
 Anthony Stewart Head as Rupert Giles

Recurring cast

Guest cast 
 Elizabeth Anne Allen as Amy Madison
 Dean Butler as Hank Summers

Production 
Series creator Joss Whedon served as executive producer and showrunner, and wrote three episodes: the two-part premiere and the finale, the latter of which he also directed. Whedon also received a "Story by" credit for the episodes "Nightmares" and "Out of Mind, Out of Sight".  David Greenwalt joined the series as co-executive producer because 20th Century Fox wanted an experienced television producer as Whedon had never run a television series before. Greenwalt wrote three episodes, one of which was based on a story by Whedon. Two pairs of story editors, Rob Des Hotel & Dean Batali and Matt Kiene & Joe Reinkemeyer, wrote three episodes between them. Staff writers Ashley Gable and Thomas A. Swyden wrote two episodes, one of which was based on a story by Whedon. Dana Reston wrote a single episode as a freelance script. The only director to direct more than one episode was Bruce Seth Green, who directed three episodes. 

Whedon says that "Rhonda the Immortal Waitress was really the first incarnation of the Buffy concept, just the idea of some woman who seems to be completely insignificant who turns out to be extraordinary." This early, unproduced idea evolved into Buffy, which Whedon developed to invert the Hollywood formula of "the little blonde girl who goes into a dark alley and gets killed in every horror movie." Whedon wanted "to subvert that idea and create someone who was a hero." He explained, "The very first mission statement of the show was the joy of female power: having it, using it, sharing it."

The season was shot throughout 1996, with the idea first visiting through Whedon's script for the 1992 movie Buffy the Vampire Slayer, which featured Kristy Swanson in the title role. The director, Fran Rubel Kuzui, saw it as a "pop culture comedy about what people think about vampires." Whedon disagreed: "I had written this scary film about an empowered woman, and they turned it into a broad comedy. It was crushing." The script was praised within the industry, but the movie was not.

Several years later, Gail Berman, a Fox executive, approached Whedon to develop his Buffy concept into a television series. Whedon explained that "They said, 'Do you want to do a show?' And I thought, 'High school as a horror movie.' And so the metaphor became the central concept behind Buffy, and that's how I sold it." The supernatural elements in the series stood as metaphors for personal anxieties associated with adolescence and young adulthood. Whedon went on to write and partly fund a 25-minute non-broadcast pilot that was shown to networks and eventually sold to The WB Television Network. The latter promoted the premiere with a series of History of the Slayer clips, and the first episode aired on March 10, 1997. Whedon declared in June 2003 that the non-broadcast pilot would not be included with DVDs of the series, stating that it "sucks on ass."

Episodes

Reception 
On the review aggregator website Metacritic, the first season scored 80 out of 100, based on 15 reviews, indicating "Generally favorable reviews". Rotten Tomatoes gave season one a score of 92% with an average rating of 8 out of 10 based on 26 reviews with a critics' consensus stating, "Buffy slays her way into the pop-culture lexicon in a debut season that lays the groundwork for one of TV's greatest supernatural teen dramas."

The pilot episode, "Welcome to the Hellmouth", was nominated for a Primetime Emmy Award for Outstanding Makeup for a Series.

DVD release 
Buffy the Vampire Slayer: The Complete First Season was released on DVD in region 1 on January 15, 2002 and in region 2 on November 27, 2000. The DVD includes all 12 episodes on three discs presented in full frame 1.33:1 aspect ratio. Special features on the DVD include a commentary track by creator Joss Whedon on "Welcome to Hellmouth" and "The Harvest", along with the original script for the episode. Other features include interviews with Joss Whedon and cast member David Boreanaz, with Whedon discussing the episodes "Witch", "Never Kill a Boy on the First Date", "Angel" and "The Puppet Show". Also included are cast/crew biographies, DVD-ROM content, photo galleries, and series trailers.

References

External links 
 
 List of Buffy the Vampire Slayer season 1 episodes at BuffyGuide.com
 

 
1997 American television seasons